Elleray is a surname. Notable people with the surname include:

David Elleray (born 1954), English football referee
John Elleray (born 1946), English cricketer
Peter Elleray (born 1958), English engineer and race car designer

See also
 Ellery (surname)
 Ellory, surname